Saiful (born 9 September 2002) is an Indonesian professional footballer who plays as an attacking midfielder for Liga 1 club Persebaya Surabaya.

Club career

Bandung United (loan) 
He was signed for Bandung United to play in the Liga 2 in the 2021 season, on loan from Persib Bandung. He made 14 league appearances and scored 3 goals for Bandung United.

Persebaya Surabaya
He was signed for Persebaya Surabaya and played in Liga 1 in 2022-2023 season. Saiful made his league debut on 7 August 2022 in a match against Bhayangkara at the Wibawa Mukti Stadium, Cikarang.

Career statistics

Club

Notes

References

External links
 Saiful at Soccerway
 Saiful at Liga Indonesia

2002 births
Living people
People from Karawang Regency
Sportspeople from West Java
Indonesian footballers
Persib Bandung players
Bandung United F.C. players
Persebaya Surabaya players
Liga 1 (Indonesia) players
Association football midfielders